Anastasius I or Anastasios I may refer to:
Anastasios I (Anastasius I Dicorus; b. 430 –  518), Roman Emperor
Anastasius I of Antioch (d. 599), Patriarch of Antioch
Pope Anastasius I (died 401), Pope of Rome